is a Japanese professional footballer, who plays as a centre back for Scottish Premiership club Celtic.

Career

Vissel Kobe 
He joined J1 League club Vissel Kobe from youth team in 2018.

Celtic 
On 23 November 2022, it was announced that Kobayashi would join Scottish club Celtic on a five-year deal, becoming available for registration on 1 January 2023. On 18 January 2023, he made his debut for the club starting in a 4–0 victory against St Mirren in the Scottish Premiership.

Personal life 
Kobayashi was born in Hyogo Prefecture.

Club statistics

Honours 
Celtic

 Scottish League Cup: 2022–23

References

External links

Profile at Vissel Kobe

2000 births
Living people
Association football people from Hyōgo Prefecture
Japanese footballers
Association football defenders
Vissel Kobe players
FC Machida Zelvia players
Yokohama FC players
J1 League players
J2 League players
Japan under-20 international footballers
Celtic F.C. players
Scottish Professional Football League players
Japanese expatriate footballers
Japanese expatriate sportspeople in Scotland
Expatriate footballers in Scotland